Ferreira do Amaral may refer to: 

 João Maria Ferreira do Amaral (1803–1849), military and politician
 Francisco Joaquim Ferreira do Amaral (1843–1923), military and politician, son of the above
 João Maria Ferreira do Amaral II (1876–1931), military, illegitimate son of the above
 Augusto Basto Ferreira do Amaral (1886–1947), engineer, son of the second above
 João Maria Barreto Ferreira do Amaral, 2nd Baron of Oliveira Lima (1909–?), son of the above
 Joaquim Martins Ferreira do Amaral (born 1945)
 João Martins Ferreira do Amaral (born 1948), brother of the above